Peter Zygmunt Milczyn  (born ) is a former politician in Ontario, Canada. He was a Liberal member of the  Legislative Assembly of Ontario  from 2014 to 2018 who represented the west Toronto riding of Etobicoke—Lakeshore. He was a member of cabinet in the government of Kathleen Wynne. He was Minister of Housing from 2017 to 2018. Previously, he was a city councillor in Toronto, Ontario from 2000 to 2014.

Background
Milczyn was born in Etobicoke. His parents, Wes Milczyn and Maria Graf, emigrated from Poland in 1963. His mother worked as a journalist in Poland. He attended Etobicoke Collegiate Institute and the University of Toronto where he obtained a degree in architecture. He set up his own design firm, but his interest in urban planning issues propelled him into politics.

His wife, Rose Milczyn, is a former municipal civil servant who was appointed to Toronto City Council in August 2022 as a temporary caretaker councillor following the resignation of Michael Ford.

Politics

Municipal
Milczyn ran for a seat on the Etobicoke city council in 1991. He came third behind winner Alex Faulkner.  He ran again in 1994 and beat out eight other contenders in Ward 2 after Faulkner retired from politics.

In 1993, he became president of Etobicoke—Lakeshore  Liberal Party riding association. He quit this position, however, when then Liberal Party leader Jean Chrétien appointed Jean Augustine to run as the party's candidate in the riding in the 1993 Canadian federal election. This decision overrode his association's recommendation of Mary Sopta as the candidate. The Liberal party felt that Sopta's Serbo-Croatian background would create tension. Milczyn characterized that as "racist". Milczyn complained that Augustine was being appointed as the Liberal candidate only because she was black. He said, "It's only a factor with me inasmuch as it upsets me that they're using it (color) as a factor."
  
With the merger of Etobicoke and other municipalities to form the new City of Toronto, he ran, but failed to win a seat on Toronto city council in 1997. In the 2000 municipal election he ran again and this time defeating incumbent Blake Kinahan in a close race. He backed John Tory for Mayor of Toronto in the 2003 municipal election.

Provincial
Milczyn ran as the Liberal candidate in the Etobicoke—Lakeshore provincial by-election, caused by the resignation of Laurel Broten, which was held August 1, 2013. He was defeated by fellow Toronto councillor Doug Holyday, running for the Progressive Conservatives. In the 2014 general election he faced Holyday again this time defeating him by 6,548 votes.

He served as a Parliamentary Assistant to the Minister of Economic Development, Employment and Infrastructure.

On July 31, 2017, Milczyn was promoted to cabinet and appointed as Minister of Housing.

Cabinet positions

Electoral record

References

External links

1965 births
21st-century Canadian politicians
Canadian people of Polish descent
Living people
Members of the Executive Council of Ontario
Ontario Liberal Party MPPs
People from Etobicoke
Toronto city councillors
University of Toronto alumni